Riverdale Junior and Senior High School is the junior and senior high school for the Riverdale School District. It is located in Muscoda, Wisconsin. As of June 2021, Jeffrey Campbell is the Principal.

External links
Riverdale Junior and Senior High School website
Riverdale School District

Public high schools in Wisconsin
Schools in Grant County, Wisconsin